Trovebox was a digital photography sharing and management platform. As of March 31, 2015, the service has shut down.

History 

Trovebox was initially started by Jaisen Mathai as a Kickstarter project and launched in December 2011. Trovebox was originally known as OpenPhoto until being rebranded in January 2013.

Trovebox received funding from the Shuttleworth Foundation.

On January 16, 2015, the company announced that they would be shutting down on March 31, 2015.

Features 
Trovebox consisted of a platform API, web application, iOS application and Android application. A unique feature of Trovebox was the ability to connect to various cloud storage services including Dropbox, Box, Amazon S3, Dreamhost Dreamobjects and Trovebox's own storage.

Trovebox's server-side, Android app, and iOS client source code is available on GitHub under the Apache open source license for users who prefer to install Trovebox themselves.

References

External links 
 Trovebox homepage
 Opensource Trovebox Community Edition

Image-sharing websites
American photography websites
Internet properties established in 2011
Kickstarter-funded products